The annual NCAA Division II Women's Lacrosse Championship tournament has determined the top women's lacrosse team in the NCAA Division II since the 2001 season (2000–01 school year).

Adelphi is the most successful team, with nine national titles.

Champions
See Association for Intercollegiate Athletics for Women Champions for the 1981 and 1982 Division II women's lacrosse champions.

Championship Records

 Schools highlighted in pink are closed or no longer sponsor athletics.
 Schools highlight in yellow have reclassified athletics from NCAA Division II.

See also
AIAW Intercollegiate Women's Lacrosse Champions
NCAA Division I Women's Lacrosse Championship
NCAA Division III Women's Lacrosse Championship
NCAA Division II Men's Lacrosse Championship

References

External links
Division II women's lacrosse at ncaa.org

Division II
Women's lacrosse competitions in the United States
Lacrosse, women's